Gloria Olusola Bamiloye  is a Nigerian dramatist, film actress, producer and director. She is a co-founder of Mount Zion Drama Ministry.

Early life
 She was born on the 4th of February, 1964 in Ilesa, a city in Osun State, southwestern Nigeria. Gloria was raised a Muslim, but converted to Christianity. She studied English language and religious studies at Oyo State College of Education in Ilesha. She continued her education and received teacher preparation at the Divisional Teachers Training College in Ipetumodu.

Career 
She met Mike Bamiloye in 1983 and eventually married him. Together, they co-founded the Mount Zion Faith Ministry on August 5, 1985. She has starred in, directed and produced several Christian Nigerian movies and dramas. In 2002, she wrote a book, The Anxiety of Single Sisters.

Personal life 

Mike  and Gloria first met at Oyo State College of Education in Ilesha. On October 8, 1988, they married. Gloria was 24, and Mike was 28. However, because his only employment was his full-time involvement in a theatrical ministry, the marriage went against her parents' wishes. She has three children and four grand-children.

Selected filmography

Agbara nla (1992)
Apoti Eri
Just A Little Sin
Story Of My Life
Blood on the Altar
Wounded Heart
The Great Mistake
The Haunting Shadows 1 (2005)
The Haunting Shadows 2 (2005)
The Haunting Shadows 3 (2005)
Shackles 1 (2019)
Shackles 2: Fetters of Iron (2020)
Higher Calling (2020)
My Mother-in-Law 1 (2020)
My Mother-in-Law 2 (2020)
My Mother-in-Law 3 (2020)
My Mother-in-Law 4; episodes 1 - 4 (2021)
 Strategies 1 (2020) Strategies 2 (2020)
Gbemi 1 (2022)
Gbemi 2 (2022)
Magdalene (2022)
My Dream (2022)

See also
 List of Nigerian film producers
List of Yoruba people

References

Living people
Yoruba actresses
Actresses from Ilesha
People from Osun
Nigerian film actresses
Nigerian women writers
Nigerian dramatists and playwrights
Nigerian film directors
Nigerian film producers
1964 births
Nigerian women film producers
20th-century Nigerian actresses
21st-century Nigerian actresses
Nigerian women film directors